John Stevens may refer to:

Architecture and engineering
 John Stevens (inventor, born 1749) (1749–1838), American engineer who developed the multitubular boiler engine and the screw propeller
 John Stevens (architect) (1824–1881), American architect
 John Calvin Stevens (1855–1940), American architect
 John Frank Stevens (1853–1943), builder of the Great Northern Railway in the U.S., chief engineer on the Panama Canal
 John H. Stevens (1820–1900), built the first house west of the Mississippi in what is now Minneapolis, Minnesota

Business
 John Austin Stevens (banker) (1795–1874), American
 John J. Stevens (1852–1928), American businessman
 John Peters Stevens (1868–1929), CEO of the J.P. Stevens Textile Corporation

Entertainment
 John A. Stevens (1844–1916), American playwright and actor
 John Stevens (drummer) (1940–1994), English drummer and founding member of the Spontaneous Music Ensemble
 John D. Stevens (born 1951), American composer and tuba player
 John Stevens (singer) (born 1987), American Idol contestant
 Steve Brodie (actor) (1919–1992), American actor, born John Stevens, or John Stevenson

Law
 John Sanborn Stevens (1838–1912), Illinois lawyer
 John Paul Stevens (1920–2019), U.S. Supreme Court Associate Justice
 John Stevens, Baron Stevens of Kirkwhelpington (born 1942), former Commissioner of the Metropolitan Police
 John Morgan Stevens (1876–1951), justice of the Supreme Court of Mississippi

Military
 John Harvey Stevens (died 1866), Royal Marines officer
 John Stevens (Royal Navy officer) (1900–1989), British admiral
 John Stevens (admiral) (born 1927), Australian Deputy Chief of Naval Staff (1979–1981)

Politics
 John Stevens (New Jersey politician) (c. 1716–1792), delegate to the Continental Congress
 John Stevens (English politician) (born 1955), founder of the Pro-Euro Conservative Party
 John Stevens (Tennessee politician) (born 1973), Tennessee State Senator
 John Stevens (New Hampshire politician) (1783–1848), New Hampshire politician
 John Stevens (New Zealand politician) (1845–1916), politician
 J. Christopher Stevens (1960–2012), American diplomat, U.S. ambassador to Libya
 John L. Stevens (1820–1895), U.S. Ambassador to the Kingdom of Hawai'i
 John Shorter Stevens (1933–2019), American lawyer and politician
 John Valentine Stevens (1852–1925), British trade unionist and politician

Sports

Cricket
 John Stevens (cricketer, born 1769) (1769–1863), English cricketer, mostly played for Essex
 John Stevens (cricketer, born 1854) (1854–?), English cricketer
 John Stevens (cricketer, born 1875) (1875–1923), English cricketer
 John Stevens (New Zealand cricketer) (1828-1873), New Zealand cricketer
 John Stevens (Victoria cricketer) (1811–1891), Indian-born Australian cricketer
 John Stevens (New South Wales cricketer) (born 1948), Australian cricketer

Other sports
 John Stevens (footballer) (born 1971), Australian rules footballer
 John Stevens (ice hockey) (born 1966), Canadian ice hockey player and coach
 John Cox Stevens (1785–1857), American yachtsman
 Johnny Stevens (1912–1981), American baseball umpire

Other people
 John Stevens (translator) (died 1726), Hispanist and translator
 John Austin Stevens (1827–1910), founder of the Sons of the Revolution
 John Stevens (Wisconsin inventor) (1840–1920), of the flour roller mill
 John Robert Stevens (1919–1983), American Christian preacher
 John Stevens (academic) (1921–2002), English musicologist, literary scholar and historian
 John Stevens (crime reporter) (1929–2016), for the London Evening Standard
 John Stevens (scholar) (born 1947), aikido teacher, Buddhist priest and teacher

See also
 Jon Stevens (born 1962), New Zealand singer
 John S. Stevens (disambiguation), several people
 John Stephens (disambiguation)
 Johnny Stevens (1912–1981), American baseball umpire
 Johnny Stevens (singer), singer from rock band Highly Suspect 
 Jack Stevens (disambiguation)